This is a list of major and minor characters featured in the Cartoon Network and Kids' WB animated series Teen Titans.

Overview

Primary Teen Titans

Robin

  Voiced by: Scott Menville
 
Robin is the leader of the Teen Titans. Despite lacking superpowers, he is fierce and highly disciplined with heroic virtue based on experience and reputation. As elaborated in the episode "Go", Robin forms the group after aiding Starfire in her escape from captivity, with the help of Beast Boy, Cyborg, and Raven. Before this, he left his mentor Batman, in an effort to make it on their own as crime-fighters. He is Dick Grayson, the first Robin. The Teen Titans Go! spin-off comic identifies him as Dick and Batman as his mentor, but neither of those reveals occur in the show. In the future, he becomes Nightwing. Robin is best friends with Starfire, whom he secretly has romantic feelings for her. Their love grows and develops throughout the show. They become a couple in the finale movie.

Starfire

 Voiced by: Hynden Walch

Starfire (as translated into English) is a humanoid alien female from the planet Tamaran. As learned in the episode "Betrothed", her real name and title is Princess Koriand'r. In the events of "Go", Starfire arrives on Earth while escaping captivity from Trogaar, an alien overlord intending to sell her into slavery. She creates mass havoc on an Earth city in an effort to break free from her restraints, arousing the ire of crime-fighters Robin, Beast Boy and Cyborg. Raven later appears to convince them to settle the dispute peacefully, and the friendship between the five grows from there. After dispatching the alien invaders, Starfire chooses to stay on Earth with her newfound friends. She is also Robin’s love interest in this series, and they secretly harbor strong romantic feelings for each other throughout the series until they finally confess their love and become a couple in the series finale movie.

Raven

 Voiced by: Tara Strong
 
Raven is usually depicted with a neutral expression on her face, and as somewhat of a stereotypical, apathetic "goth". Raven wears a blue-hooded shroud, which casts a characteristic shadow over much of her face, and a black leotard decorated with a belt. She has pale skin, violet-blue eyes, and a bob-cut hairstyle, with a mystical stone in the middle of her forehead. Shrouded in mystery even from her debut appearance, little is known about Raven and her past, and she is emotionally distant even from her fellow Titans much of the time. It is later discovered that this is intentional, due to the grave secrets Raven is carrying with her throughout the series.

Raven's chief powers are her flight, a studious mastery of magic, and her telekinetic and psychokinetic abilities, with her mind empowering her to levitate objects by surrounding them in dark mystical energy. This ability often comes about after chanting the incantation "Azarath Metrion Zinthos", allowing her to make use of her powers in a myriad of forms. Apart from the psychokinetic energy she wields, Raven is also a master of extrasensory perception, able to sense and read the minds of others.

Beast Boy

 Voiced by: Greg Cipes

Beast Boy is a teenage juvenile with green skin, fangs, dark green hair and jungle green eyes. He has the superhuman capability of shapeshifting into any animal of his choosing at will, therefore gaining the abilities of that animal. A former member of the Doom Patrol, he left the group in an effort to become a solo superhero; by sheer happenstance stemming from Lord Trogaar's pursuit of Starfire, he finds himself joining the Teen Titans. His early training under the tutelage of the Doom Patrol is highly disciplined and militarized, leading him to address more experienced heroes as "Sir" in the beginning. As time wears on, he would become less serious and acts as the merry prankster and comic relief of the Teen Titans which frequently annoys his teammates. In the two-part episode "Homecoming", his real name is revealed to be Garfield.

Cyborg

 Voiced by: Khary Payton

Once an ordinary human, he becomes a deformed mesh of flesh and machine following an unelaborated "accident" that caused most of his body to be replaced with cybernetic implants. His condition is virtually impossible to disguise, though he initially attempts to do so by covering much of his body with heavy clothing and a hooded sweatshirt. His neighborhood falls under attack when Starfire appears on Earth in the episode "Go", and as such, he comes to the aid of Robin and Beast Boy in their tussle with her. He is the tech-savvy member of the team who is Robin's second-in-command and Beast Boy's best friend.

Terra

 Voiced by: Ashley Johnson

Debuting in the episode which bears her name, Terra is a super-powered teenage girl with Terra kinetic abilities; she is able to telekinetically control the earth, often preferring to use rocks and boulders as projectiles, as well as a vehicular means of travel. She is a slim and pale blonde-haired, blue-eyed girl of unknown origins, and lives a nomadic lifestyle in the wilderness, constantly moving around. She eventually comes to settle in the coastal hometown of the Teen Titans.

Upon meeting the team, she quickly forms a bond with them, leading to their offer of Terra becoming the Teen Titans' newest member. Her bond is strongest with Beast Boy, with whom she has a complicated romantic relationship. Beast Boy is the first to discover that Terra has trouble controlling her powers, which he is then sworn to secrecy not to reveal to anyone. During a confrontation with the Titans' nemesis Slade, he reveals that he had been stalking her for years and knows that Terra's lack of control had caused a number of natural disasters across the globe, thereby explaining why Terra never stays in one place for too long. Convinced that the Titans would shun her once this knowledge becomes public, Slade offers to train her in using her abilities before he escapes capture. Robin later deduces Terra's instability, and—incorrectly believing that Beast Boy had revealed their secret—she leaves the Titans and disappears.

Terra later reunites with the Titans with more of a control over her powers and earns the trust of the team after helping to save their home in "Titan Rising". However, Slade's forces would later launch a surprise attack on a defenseless Titans Tower, while Terra spends a night out with an unknowing Beast Boy. Having followed the two, Slade reveals that Terra had become his new apprentice and had been acting as a double agent sabotaging the team since her return. A heartbroken Beast Boy spurns her apologies, fueling a hate-filled Terra to decimate the team in the Part 1 episode of "Aftershock". In part 2, the Titans regroup to retake the besieged city, leading to her thrashing by Slade after she is forced into retreat. With Slade in control of her body by way of her battle suit, she finds herself unable to leave and fights the Titans against her will. With the help of Beast Boy and the other Titans, she regains control of her powers and triggers an underground volcano that kills Slade; however, the volcano rages out of control, and to prevent it from destroying the city above ground, she sacrifices herself to stop it from erupting, turning to stone as a result. The Titans pay tribute to her with a memorial plaque, which reads "Terra—A Teen Titan, A True Friend".

Terra is seemingly reincarnated in the series finale, "Things Change". Following the Titans' hometown return after their longtime battle with the Brotherhood of Evil, they do battle with an adaptoid creature; giving chase, Beast Boy suddenly notices a girl resembling Terra standing amongst the crowd of onlooking civilians. After Beast Boy discovers the lifeless stone statue of Terra in the base of Slade's old headquarters is now missing, he believes that she had somehow been revived while they were away. Beast Boy tracks her down only to find that she apparently has no memory of the Titans, has no apparent superpowers, and she is never addressed as "Terra" by anyone other than Beast Boy while the name that others refer her to remain unknown. At the episode's end, she eventually explains to Beast Boy that even if she is indeed the Terra he once knew, she only wants to lead a normal life and convinces him to move on. Whether she truly is Terra is left unrevealed.

Teen Titans Go!
In an issue of the Teen Titans comic book following the events of the series' final episode, Geo-Force—Terra's superhero half-brother—makes an appearance in which he reveals that Terra, like he, is a member of the Markovian royal family that fled their home nation after they were both subjected to forced experimentation with a fictitious chemical called Quixium that gave them both earth-manipulating superpowers. This issue sheds light on where Terra came from, in addition to the source of her powers. Geo-Force is later convinced to allow Terra to live without her superpowers in peace and leaves without ever reuniting with her. However, how Terra got out of her stone state, who is currently looking after her, and how she lost her memory currently remains a mystery.

Honorary Titans

Aqualad

 Voiced by: Wil Wheaton

The ex-sidekick of Aquaman, Aqualad makes his debut in the episode "Deep Six", employing the help of the Teen Titans in defeating an Atlantean criminal named Trident. He butts heads with Beast Boy in that episode as he feels shown up by the impressive young Atlantean, but in their battles with Trident, Beast Boy and Aqualad make peace by the episode's end. He returns in "Wavelength", needing the Titans' help to take out Brother Blood's second undersea H.I.V.E. Headquarters. Following Blood's escape, they give chase and track him to Steel City, where he and Bumblebee form the Titans East. He later falls prey to Blood's mind control, turning on appointed leader Cyborg and does battle with Titans Central; he is freed after Cyborg defeats Brother Blood in the final battle, and stays on with Titans East.

Argent

 Voiced by: Hynden Walch

Argent is a female Honorary Titan who first appears in "Calling All Titans". Deputized by Starfire while walling off a fractured dam, she is soon attacked and captured by General Immortus and flash-frozen at their headquarters in Paris. She is later freed and takes part in the final battle of "Titans Together", briefly seen in the background fighting Johnny Rancid, and is standing near the foreground at the episode's conclusion when the World Titans are summoned to stop Doctor Light. Prior to her official appearances in the aforementioned episodes, Argent also appears via cameo in the episode "Lightspeed", briefly displayed on the H.I.V.E. Five's computer monitor.

Bumblebee

 Voiced by: T'Keyah Crystal Keymáh

Bumblebee is first seen as a H.I.V.E. student, but is later revealed to have been a spy in the organization working in league with Aqualad. As she reveals in a staged fight with Cyborg, she is unable to fall under Brother Blood's hypnotic influence. She later becomes a founding member of Titans East, convincing Cyborg to become the team's leader, when in fact it turns out to be an elaborate trap staged by Blood when she falls back under his control—though she appeared to be the only one of the group able to occasionally slip free. After Blood is defeated, Cyborg steps down from Titans East, making Bumblebee the new leader.

Bushido

 Voiced by: Dee Bradley Baker

Bushido is a young silent Japanese swordsman, who is made an Honorary Titan to fend off an incursion by the Brotherhood of Evil, which is preparing to mount an assault on young heroes. In "Calling All Titans", he is defeated and captured by Professor Chang, along with much of the other Titans.

Gnarrk

 Voiced by: Dee Bradley Baker

Gnarrk is the caveman friend of Kole seen in the episode "Kole". He is given his name due to the fact that it is the only thing he can say or understand. A primal predecessor of contemporary human beings, he has an abnormal level of agility and strength. When Kole activates her crystallization powers, Gnarrk is able to use her body to great effect as a bludgeoning tool.

Herald

 Voiced by: Khary Payton

Herald is a young hooded African American boy who is made an Honorary Titan in the wake of the Brotherhood's efforts to seek and destroy the next generation of superheroes on Earth. He is one of the few Titan-affiliated heroes that manages to evade capture, and partners with fellow survivors Beast Boy, Más, Pantha, and Jericho. The five succeed in infiltrating the Brotherhood's fortress in Paris and ultimately freeing the captured heroes; Herald himself is called upon to save everyone when the Brain, forced into retreat, triggers a massive bomb designed to take out the entire complex.

Hot Spot

 Voiced by: Bumper Robinson

First featured in the Master of Games' Tournament of Heroes in "Winner Take All", Hot Spot is a pyrokinetic young hero who is made an Honorary Titan in the wake of the Master of Games' defeat. In his normal state, he has the appearance of an adolescent African American male, but when employing his heat-based superpowers, he becomes a humanoid embodiment of fire.

Jericho

 Voiced by: None

Jericho is another Honorary Titan that, alongside Herald, is summoned to the Titans' rendezvous point after the Brotherhood conducts their search-and-capture campaign on the team members across the globe. Jericho is a gentle and kindly albeit mute blonde boy with the ability to possess his enemies, thereby taking full control of their bodies, memories and abilities; the only evidence of which is the black and green eyes the victims assume once possessed.

Jinx

 Voiced by: Lauren Tom; Tara Strong ("Titans Together")

An agile sorceress with a mastery of hexes brought to rival Raven's magical skills, Jinx is a pink-haired, cat-eyed teen girl that uses a form of black magic to bring about "bad luck"-themed attacks, such as by crumbling the ground beneath opponents or causing structures to collapse around them. She is often portrayed as the leader and battle coordinator of any H.I.V.E.-affiliated group.

She becomes enamored with the flirtatious Kid Flash, thereby parting ways with the H.I.V.E. altogether and joining the Teen Titans in their battle with the Brotherhood in the climax of "Titans Together".
 	
She, alongside Sergeant H.I.V.E., officially joins the Teen Titans in an issue of the accompanying comic book series Teen Titans Go! and she also becomes Kid Flash's official girlfriend with them sharing an official kiss in issue #53.

Kid Flash

 Voiced by: Michael Rosenbaum

Debuting in "Lightspeed", Kid Flash, the self-proclaimed "Fastest Boy Alive" and former sidekick to Flash (Barry Allen), appears as a thorn in the side of the freshly formed H.I.V.E. Five, composed of H.I.V.E. alums Mammoth, See-More, Kyd Wykked, Billy Numerous, Gizmo, and Jinx. He later finds himself captured by the H.I.V.E. Five, but manages to escape by vibrating through his cell bars; he is then relentlessly pursued by the Brotherhood's Madame Rouge, but narrowly manages to get away. Once the Brotherhood of Evil launches its full assault on the world's young heroes, Kid Flash is able to avoid capture; he later arrives to participate in the final battle, helping the World Titans defeat the Brotherhood with the help of a new ally: Jinx, with whom Kid Flash had been flirting with for some time. His secret identity is not revealed in the series, although he is implied to be Wally West, the original Kid Flash.

Killowat

 Voiced by: Yuri Lowenthal

Killowat is an Honorary Titan with a command over electricity. Only featured a few times in the series, Killowat is a young male with luminescent electric-blue skin, glowing iris less white eyes, and tattoo-like magenta streaks of lightning on his arms and torso.

Kole

 Voiced by: Tara Strong

Featured in the episode which bears her name, Kole is a young, pink-haired girl living with her caveman friend Gnarrk beneath the North Pole. She is able to crystallize herself as a defense mechanism thereby rendering her indestructible, allowing her partner Gnarrk to use her diamond-hard body as a weapon against aggressors. In the climax of the episode "Kole", she uses this power to focus and amplify one of Starfire's Star Bolts through her body to help the Teen Titans defeat Dr. Light.

Más y Menos

 Voiced by: Freddy Rodriguez

Debuting in the two-part episode "Titans East", Más y Menos are superpowered twin brothers from Guatemala that join Bumblebee, Speedy and Aqualad in the newly formed Titans East. They generate different polarities of bio-electromagnetism that, once combined, give the duo super-speed. This power can only work once the two brothers make physical contact with each other, and as such, they are inseparable.

Melvin, Timmy, Teether, and Bobby
 Voiced by: Russi Taylor (Melvin, Timmy), Tara Strong (Teether)

Melvin, Timmy, and Teether comprise a trio of pre-adolescent children targeted by the Brotherhood of Evil for their fledgling superpowers. They first appear in "Hide and Seek".

Melvin, the only girl in the group and the eldest of the three, has the ability to mentally spawn a giant animated teddy bear named Bobby. Timmy (the second oldest) throws temper tantrums which induce earthquakes and sonic booms, and Teether (the baby) can eat any form of matter and spit them out like bullets. Raven is assigned to protect them from Monsieur Mallah who is hunting them down on the Brotherhood's behalf, but the children (and Bobby) manage to take him down on their own. As a reward, they are made Honorary Titans.

Bobby is Melvin's "imaginary friend", a giant, menacing teddy bear that she can physically manifest from her mind. He is able to turn invisible, which he primarily uses to hide from people he fears or doesn't trust. As a result, Raven did not believe he existed for most of the episode.

Pantha

 Voiced by: Diane Delano

Pantha is another Honorary Titan who had been targeted by the Brotherhood of Evil; in spite of their best efforts, she manages to prevent her capture. She partners with Beast Boy, Jericho, Herald, and Más to free their captured comrades. Pantha also proves useful as being bilingual; speaking both Spanish and English, she translates Más' instructions as he guides the group to where the frozen Titans are being held in the Brotherhood's fortress.

Red Star

 Voiced by: Jason Marsden

Red Star first appears in "Snow Blind", rescuing an unconscious Starfire from a snowstorm. He is found to be living in a quarantined facility in complete isolation from the rest of civilization. Red Star, also addressed in the episode as Cpt. Kovar, is seen as an older Russian teen boy with an impressive well-toned physique, reddish-brown hair and iris less green eyes.

Speedy

 Voiced by: Mike Erwin

Formerly the sidekick to Green Arrow, Speedy debuts in "Winner Take All" competing in the Master of Games' Tournament of Heroes. He and Robin make it to the finals, where Speedy narrowly loses. Once Robin discovers the Master of Games' plot to steal the losers' powers and abilities, he does battle with the Master, ultimately freeing Speedy who helps dispatch him with an arrow to his amulet. He is then made an Honorary Titan, and later joins the Titans East.

Thunder and Lightning

 Voiced by: S. Scott Bullock (Thunder), Quinton Flynn (Lightning)

Thunder and Lightning are the first Honorary Titans to appear in the series; they debut in "Forces of Nature", and are a twosome of brothers that are the living incarnations of their respective namesakes. They arrive from the clouds, wreaking havoc on the city in which the Teen Titans live; Beast Boy later deduces that the duo is not evil, but rather misunderstood—they display their destructive powers in acts that they perceive as innocent fun, and battle the Titans on occasion, seeing the challenge as mere roughhousing. The two are later manipulated into creating a fire creature by Slade, who is in the guise of an old Asian shaman; however, the two learn the error of their ways thanks to Beast Boy (himself, a polarizing prankster), and they go on to become heroes allied with the Titans.

Tramm
 Voiced by: Dave Coulier; Dee Bradley Baker ("Calling All Titans")

Aqualad's engineer, mechanic and friend, Tramm helps the Titans fix their battle-damaged T-Sub in the episode "Deep Six". He speaks in an indecipherable undersea language and has the appearance of a short, anthropomorphic anchovy. In direct combat, he can increase his size and strength, much like a pufferfish.

Wildebeest

 Voiced by: Jim Cummings ("Winner Take All"), Dee Bradley Baker

First appearing as a competitor in the Master of Games' alleged Tournament of Heroes in the episode "Winner Take All", Wildebeest is a hulking, humanoid Chimera of his namesake; though his personal level of coherence, intelligence and even hygiene is of a questionable degree, he is formidable for wielding a bestial level of strength and agility. Wildebeest is made an Honorary Titan following the Master's defeat at the hands of the tournament winner, Robin, alongside Hot Spot and Speedy.

Wonder Girl

 Voiced by: None

Wonder Girl, the sidekick counterpart to Wonder Woman and once a founding member of the Teen Titans, was denied inclusion to the main cast of the series due to licensing issues. As a result, Wonder Girl never prominently appears in the series and she is never referred to. Nonetheless, Wonder Girl is featured in hidden cameos in the show's final season, where she is seen as a blue-eyed young girl with dark hair put up into a ponytail and golden star-shaped earrings. She is later prominently featured in the Teen Titans Go! spin-off comic and identified as Donna Troy, the original Wonder Girl.

Allies

Brushogun
 Voiced by: Cary-Hiroyuki Tagawa

Seen only in Teen Titans: Trouble in Tokyo, Brushogun was formerly a Tokyo artist who fell in love with a woman he drew. He used black magic to bring her to life, and it worked, but he was cursed by the magic, turned into a monstrous being with the ability to create live ink drawings.

The Doom Patrol

Only appearing in the two-part episode "Homecoming", the Doom Patrol is a paramilitary unit of superheroes, locked in a long-standing battle against the Brotherhood of Evil. One of their former members is Beast Boy, who had become estranged from the team years before.

Elasti-Girl

 Voiced by: Tara Strong

The lone female member of the team and Mento’s wife, Elasti-Girl has the ability to expand her body thereby rendering her to giant size; though it consequently makes her an easier target that is harder to miss, an attack as benign as a foot stomp can level an entire field of enemies merely from the shock wave.

Mento

 Voiced by: Xander Berkeley

Mento is the leader and battle coordinator of the Doom Patrol. His uniform signifies as such by way of a yellow lightning-bolt symbol on its chest. Amplified by the helmet atop his head, Mento's super-abilities stem from his formidable mental powers, ranging from telekinesis and mind-reading to quick-acting hypnotic suggestion.

Negative Man

 Voiced by: Judge Reinhold

Heavily bandaged throughout his body, Negative Man has the power of astral projection; able to separate his soul from his body, his "negative self" has targeted intangibility: enemies cannot harm him while in this state, though he can physically interact with solid objects and people. However, this separation ability can only work for a limited time, as extended use of it could lead to its effects being permanent.

Robot Man

 Voiced by: Peter Onorati

Robot Man is a towering metal robotic vessel housing a still-living human brain; as such, he has incredibly devastating strength and is practically invulnerable to harm. However, still capable of free thought, Robot Man is headstrong and reckless, often preferring to charge headlong into battle than defer to stealth.

Larry
 Voiced by: Dee Bradley Baker

Nosyarg Kcid, a.k.a. Larry, is Robin's Bat-Mite-like counterpart from another dimension. His right index finger has the power to bend reality, and he uses it to watch Robin and his adventures. He enters the Titans' dimension to help fix Robin's broken arm, but fails to do so. He breaks his own finger during a scuffle with Robin as he keeps insisting on helping him; as a result, his reality-warping power is unleashed upon the city, changing it first into an embodiment of a child-drawn picture, and later into a dark, demonic domain when Titans foe Johnny Rancid seizes the power for himself. After Larry's finger is repaired and all is brought back to normal, he returns to his own dimension, but not before Robin offers him the chance to fix his broken arm one last time. He succeeds, but accidentally leaves Robin stranded in a blank, white space in the process.

Sarasim
 Voiced by: Kimberly Brooks

Sarasim is a warrior princess from an ancient time; the year is indicated as 3000 B.C., 5,000 years from the present day. Her tribe, which is under siege from a horde of monsters, is saved when Cyborg appears to defeat them after being sent back in time. The character's name is a reference to Sarah Simms, Cyborg's girlfriend in the comics, and Cyborg remarks in the Teen Titans Go! spin-off comic that Sarah is a reincarnation of Sarasim.

Silkie
 Voiced by: Dee Bradley Baker

Silkie (originally named "Larva M-319") is one of the many mutant larvae created by Killer Moth as part of his scheme to take over the city in "Date With Destiny". When he was stopped by the Teen Titans, Beast Boy bonded with one of the larvae, naming him "Silkie", and secretly kept him as a pet at Titans Tower.

Main villains

Slade

 Voiced by: Ron Perlman

The Titans' most recurring foe and Robin's archenemy. Slade relentlessly stalked them since "Divide and Conquer" and enlisted the H.I.V.E. Academy to reveal his existence to the heroes in "Final Exam". Serving as the main antagonist of the first two seasons, Slade attempted to make Robin his apprentice in the first season and later enlisted Terra during the events of the second in an attempt to destroy the Titans that ended with his death. But Slade is revived in the fourth season as Trigon's undead emissary to oversee the ritual to summon the demon, siding with the Titans and fully resurrecting himself when Trigon betrayed him before taking his leave.

Trigon

 Voiced by: Kevin Michael Richardson; Keith Szarabajka ("Nevermore")

Trigon (alternatively identified by the name Scath) is Raven's father and archenemy who is feared throughout the galaxies as an ancient demon king. He serves as the main antagonist of the fourth season, enlisting Slade to prepare Raven for a ritual to bring him to Earth and ends up being physically destroyed by his daughter. Trigon later returns in the 2019 crossover film Teen Titans Go! vs. Teen Titans, entering an alliance with an alternate version of himself who revives him with the Raven of his universe. But Trigon's constant belittling of counterpart while eventually revived ended with him swallowed up and absorbed by his counterpart, only to be freed after being rendered incorporeal again and sent back to his realm.

The H.I.V.E. Academy

The H.I.V.E. Academy is a secret campus for a rogue's gallery of superpowered teenagers, all being trained to become master criminals. The school has also been called the H.A.E.Y.P., which is short for "H.I.V.E. Academy for Extraordinary Young People".

Heads
The H.I.V.E. Academy has its known headmasters:

Brother Blood

 Voiced by: John DiMaggio

Brother Blood is a cult leader and the archenemy of Cyborg, who takes control over the H.I.V.E. Academy after the Headmistress turns up missing; his power is based mainly on his ability to manipulate others through mind control, bending large groups of people to his will. Aside from pure hypnosis, his mind can create vivid hallucinations, and he also boasts both a vast intelligence and a photographic memory. Blood's mental powers also allow him to interfere with radio signals and block the powers of other empaths like Aqualad; they also greatly enhance his own physical abilities: Blood is deceptively strong and quick with supernaturally high reflexes, allowing him to walk across water, pierce and rip steel with his bare hands, and channel a psychokinetic energy used to teleport or to fire offensively as bolts of lightning and force blasts.

H.I.V.E. Headmistress
 Voiced by: Andrea Romano

The Headmistress of the H.I.V.E. Academy in the first season, she commissions the services of her top graduates Gizmo, Jinx, and Mammoth out to the top bidder, who turns out to be the yet-to-be-identified Slade, in the episode "Final Exam". Slade then hires the H.I.V.E. trio to defeat the Teen Titans, which they succeed in doing temporarily until the Titans later regroup to defeat them. She tells Slade that she will "discipline" them when they are retrieved from the authorities, only for Slade to reveal that he had never expected her team to succeed in their mission—only in "delivering the message" that he exists and is watching them.

In the Teen Titans Go! comics, the Headmistress sends Rock, Paper, and Scissors to capture Wildebeest.

Students
The following are student at the H.I.V.E. Academy:

Gizmo

 Voiced by: Lauren Tom; Tara Strong ("Revved Up", "Titans Together")

An impish young boy with a genius-level intellect who is armed with a mechanized backpack that generates multiple devices, gadgets and weapons. Gizmo is also a well-versed computer hacker and inventor, and typically uses these skills against Cyborg in some way, exploiting his robotic weaknesses in any number of episodes, even when called upon by the Titans to help save Cyborg's life in the episode "Crash". Gizmo was also a short-lived Honorary Titan following the events of "Winner Take All", but was quickly stripped of that distinction.

Mammoth

 Voiced by: Kevin Michael Richardson

A hulking bestial male with mane-like hair, feral fangs, and superhuman strength. He is brought into the original H.I.V.E. trio as a counterweight to Beast Boy. The genetically modified Mammoth is the least intelligent member of this clique and is mainly used for his brawn and raw power in the execution of H.I.V.E. crimes. In spite of this, he tends to be easily defeated by the Titans in most of the episodes in which he appears.

See-More

 Voiced by: Kevin Michael Richardson

See-More is a minor villain from the H.I.V.E. Academy who joins the H.I.V.E. Five prior to "Mother Mae-Eye". His powers stem from a variety of interchangeable colored eyeballs which are accessible via a dial in his helmet; each eyeball is equipped with a unique function or attack, such as multi-vision, X-Ray vision, hypnosis, projection of eye-shaped bubbles, laser beams, and balloon-based flight. Like many of the H.I.V.E. characters, See-More first appears in the cafeteria scene of the episode "Deception".

Billy Numerous
 Voiced by: Jason Marsden

Billy Numerous is a minor villain and was once a student at the H.I.V.E. Academy; like many of the H.I.V.E. characters, Billy Numerous first appears in the cafeteria scene in the episode "Deception". His power is self-duplication, and he is known to brag about his crime sprees to his only friends: his own clones. He wears a skintight red bodysuit with a division symbol on its chest, and speaks with a rural Southern drawl.

Kyd Wykkyd
 Voiced by: Kid Wykkyd has no lines

Kyd Wykkyd is a silent, bat-costumed male student at the H.I.V.E. Academy with the ability to teleport, first seen in "Deception". After Cyborg and the Titans destroyed the H.I.V.E. and the various students went on to become renegade villains, Wykkyd joined the H.I.V.E. Five at some point before "Lightspeed". Although giving off a dark and demonic demeanor, it's shown in "Lightspeed" he's slightly childish; wanting to build a pillow fort with his teammates and joining them to hide behind Jinx when Madame Rouge arrives at their base. Nevertheless, his teleportation powers and razor-ended cape are shown in good use during battle.

Private H.I.V.E.
 Voiced by: Greg Cipes

Private H.I.V.E. is the eponymous villain from the H.I.V.E. Academy with a military demeanor who uses a hexagonal shield with the H.I.V.E.'s logo plastered upon it for attack and defense; he seems partial to throwing his shield in the style of a discus, much like Captain America. He appears to be modeled after The Guardian and says "sir" at the end of almost every sentence.

He later joins the Titans in the Teen Titans Go! comic book series, along with fellow H.I.V.E. student Jinx.

Angel
 Voiced by: Angel has no lines.

Angel is a villain from the H.I.V.E. Academy who sports bird-like wings that enable her flight. In addition, she can also size-shift them to any size for combat purposes.

XL Terrestrial
 Voiced by: XL Terrestrial has no lines

XL Terrestrial is an alien villain from the H.I.V.E. Academy with size-shifting abilities.

I.N.S.T.I.G.A.T.O.R.
 Voiced by: I.N.S.T.I.G.A.T.O.R. has no lines

The I.N.S.T.I.G.A.T.O.R. is a floating robotic villain from the H.I.V.E. Academy.

"Wrestling Star"
 Voiced by: "Wrestling Star" has no lines

"Wrestling Star" is a masked wrestler from the H.I.V.E. Academy. During the final battle between the Titans and the Brotherhood of Evil, "Wrestling Star" was defeated by Pantha who was honor bound to unmask him. He shields his face upon being unmasked and is among those flash-frozen by Más y Menos.

The Brotherhood of Evil

The Brotherhood of Evil is a secret society of supervillains dedicated to total world domination whom the Doom Patrol fought in the past, serving as the main antagonists of the final season.

Members

The Brain

 Voiced by: Glenn Shadix

The Brotherhood's leader and Beast Boy's archenemy. As suggested by the name, he is a disembodied human brain preserved in a robotic cylinder to keep it alive, only able to communicate via a voice box built in its chassis. Apart from The Brain's genius level intellect, he appears to have a degree of psychokinetic powers channeled by and through his robotic shell.

General Immortus

 Voiced by: Xander Berkeley

As implied by his name, General Immortus is an ancient military commander who is knowledgeable in every combat strategy ever conceived, mainly by being involved in every major battle in history personally. He even comments on teaching many of history's best minds of war; in the episode "Homecoming", he refers to Sun Tsu—the Chinese military philosopher and author of The Art of War—as one of his students. Immortus has command over armies of both human and robot soldiers, and often uses them as part of a larger plot in executing attacks. He is frozen by the Teen Titans at the end of "Titans Together".

Madame Rouge

 Voiced by: Hynden Walch

Madame Rouge, though appearing mainly as a black-haired Russian female dressed in red, is a malleable shape-shifter with the ability to stretch and contort her body in any way she sees fit; she is most lethal for being able to fully assume the appearances of other people, able to mimic them with little means of detection. She nearly defeats Kid Flash simply by pursuing and pummeling him into exhaustion, but later succeeds in taking down Hot Spot, taking his likeness as the Titans arrive to pass along a communicator to him. In possession of a Titans Communicator, the Brotherhood is able to coordinate their strikes against the team.

Monsieur Mallah

 Voiced by: Glenn Shadix

Monsieur Mallah is a hyper-intelligent African gorilla capable of human speech who develops many of the Doomsday Devices used by the Brotherhood. Mallah is also adept at using weapons, such as grenades and a laser-firing minigun, in conjunction with his bestial strength. Mallah is extremely loyal to his master and is his trusted confidant. It is he who suggests that they escape when the Titans begin to regroup against them, but their retreat is thwarted by Robin and Beast Boy; he is beaten by Beast Boy, and is the second-to-last Brotherhood member to be subjected to the freezing machine in "Titans Together".

Other villains

André LeBlanc

 Voiced by: Dee Bradley Baker

André LeBlanc is a French jewel thief that debuts in "For Real". He later joins the Brotherhood of Evil.

Atlas
 Voiced by: Keith David

Atlas is a robotic villain that debuts in "Only Human".

Blackfire

 Voiced by: Hynden Walch

Blackfire is the elder sister of Starfire and her rival to the throne of their home world of Tamaran. She is also a wanted criminal.

Cinderblock

 Voiced by: Dee Bradley Baker

Debuting in the series premiere episode "Divide and Conquer", Cinderblock is a living monolithic stone idol with limited intelligence, but near-unstoppable strength. He is named as such due to the several panels on his body which bear a likeness to his namesake. Cinderblock is featured multiple times in the series as a secondary villain.

Commander Uehara Daizo
 Voiced by: Keone Young

Commander Uehara Daizo appears as the main antagonist in the feature-length Teen Titans film, Teen Titans: Trouble in Tokyo. He is Tokyo's police commander, and the commander of the Tokyo Troopers, which he secretly uses Brushogun in creating. It turns out that Daizo's goal is to discredit the Teen Titans as heroes, as his own heroic reputation became diminished as the Titans' exploits become internationally known. To this end, Daizo effectively enslaves Brushogun to create criminals for him to capture, to create the Tokyo Troopers to act as his personal army, and to create the various supervillains to do battle with the Teen Titans.

Control Freak
 Voiced by: Alexander Polinsky

Control Freak is an overweight supervillain and movie fanatic, notorious for using a nuclear super-powered remote control to warp reality to suit his movie-inspired images. He first appears in the episode "Fear Itself" causing a disturbance in a movie rental outlet, angry over a non-mutual trivial dispute with the cashier regarding a sci-fi television series. The remote he self-designed is his only true source of power; however, he rarely uses his intellect to accomplish anything meaningful, instead preferring to hype himself into superiority through television, the Internet, or by committing crimes in the hopes of garnering mass respect as a supervillain.

Ding Dong Daddy

 Voiced by: David Johansen

In the episode "Revved Up", Ding Dong Daddy is a large 1950s-style street racer who forces Robin to compete in a cross-country race against himself and a number of foes from the Titans' rogues gallery; the prize being a briefcase containing what is only identified as "Robin's most prized possession". Leading the majority of the race in his undersized Hot Rod, Ding Dong Daddy ultimately finishes in second place to Robin. Having won the race, Robin reclaims his briefcase from Ding Dong Daddy. It is never revealed how Ding Dong Daddy acquired Robin's briefcase, nor what is actually inside it.

Dr. Light

 Voiced by: Rodger Bumpass

A recurring secondary villain in the series, Dr. Light—as his name implies—is a normal, powerless man who is often in use of a battle suit with offensive-capability light-energy weapons. While the most common offensive use of his suits are the firing of laser beams, he can also generate tangible solid objects from light such as laser whips, fireballs, trapping orbs, and forcefields.

Fang
 Voiced by: Will Friedle

Fang is a mutant; he is human from the neck down, but has a giant four-legged spider in place of a head. The legs of his spider head have the ability to move at fast speeds and jump vast distances, while the head itself is capable of firing sticky webs and paralysis-inflicting venom beams.

Katarou
Voiced by: Keone Young ("The Quest")
Katarou's first and only appearance is in the episode "The Quest". He is Robin's motivation to seek "The True Master" and he seems as the antagonist and Robin's rival in the episode. He is later defeated by Robin in the end and is never shown later in the show again.

Killer Moth

 Voiced by: Thomas Haden Church ("Date with Destiny"); Marc Worden ("Can I Keep Him?")

Debuting in "Date With Destiny", Killer Moth is an evil lepidopterist with command over swarms of large mutated moths that are capable of eating through anything. He is also presumably a human-moth hybrid himself; dressed in a moth-like body armor complete with razor-sharp claws and a pair of wings, he has an elevated level of speed, strength and reflexes, has the ability to adhere to walls, as well as flight. In the series, Killer Moth is the father of Kitten, the breeder of Titans mascot Silkie, and may have had a hand in the creation of Kitten's mutant boyfriend, Fang.

Kitten
 Voiced by: Tara Strong

Kitten is the spoiled and bratty daughter of Killer Moth and the girlfriend of Fang. She first appears in the episode "Date With Destiny", when Fang breaks up with her for unexplained reasons. Not wanting to attend the junior prom alone, she talks her father into threatening the city with a large swarm of mutant moths to force Robin to become her date, which instigated a fight between Fang and Robin, and then between Kitten and a jealous Starfire. It would be revealed that Kitten secretly had control of the moth's release trigger concealed in her corsage, but she, Fang, and Killer Moth are ultimately apprehended and jailed; as she is loaded into the police truck, she angrily screams that "Robbie-Poo" would pay for dumping her. Later on, the trio would appear as members of the Brotherhood of Evil; Kitten, riding atop a giant mutant moth and wielding a laser whip, confronts and defeats Starfire in "Calling All Titans", but it is later revealed that Starfire had escaped. Before attacking Starfire, Kitten swipes her communicator and uses it to taunt her former beau, Robin.

Mad Mod

 Voiced by: Malcolm McDowell

Mad Mod is a psychedelic red-headed British villain with the mannerisms of a strict schoolmarm, whose root source of power comes from his ruby-tipped cane. It is later revealed that Mod is actually an old man who uses holograms to appear younger. He is also formidable for his use of hypnotic suggestion which has a stupefying and lobotomizing effect on its victims.

Master of Games
 Voiced by: Jim Cummings

The Master of Games is an ape-like humanoid alien creature with the mannerisms of a game show host who takes the three male Titans along with Gizmo, Hot Spot, Wildebeest, Aqualad, and Speedy to his world in "Winner Take All" to hold a "Tournament of Heroes;" in reality, he is attempting to steal all of their unique skills and powers with his magic amulet.

His plan ultimately fails when Robin, the winner of his tournament, unites with Cyborg and Speedy to defeat him and destroy his amulet; after the males are returned home at the episode's conclusion, he immediately regenerates somehow and captures a cast of potential female victims composed of Raven, Starfire, Terra, and five others in silhouette for an alleged "Tournament of Heroines".

He is later inducted into the Brotherhood of Evil in the final season; after getting knocked out easily by Pantha in "Titans Together", his exact fate is unknown.

In the Teen Titans video game, he serves as the main antagonist, but is not the game's final boss.

A version of the Master of Games appears in Teen Titans Go! vs. Teen Titans, voiced by Rhys Darby. His appearance is drastically different than the original series as he is now a short, blue humanoid with red eyes. He claims to be a being that travels the multiverse to find the best versions of particular heroes by having them compete against their counterparts, and pits the Teen Titans Go! versions of the Titans against their original series counterparts. He is later revealed to be a disguised Trigon, who organized the fight to siphon Raven's powers.

Mother Mae-Eye

 Voiced by: Billie Hayes

Mother Mae-Eye is a haggish witch with candy-themed magical powers and a mass-produced army of gingerbread cookie soldiers. In her human form, she appears as a plump, rosy-cheeked and kindly woman dressed in a red, white and pink outfit, but she is actually a three-eyed, ugly, wart-nosed witch capable of growing and shrinking in size. Mae-Eye feeds on the "sweet, nourishing affection" of her victims; she then traps and bakes them within a gigantic pie in a giant potbelly stove under the guise of their "5:00 bedtime" when their love reaches its maximum. She becomes angered when her victims either come out of the spell on their own, or refuse to eat her pies; in addition to the pies, she is armed with a magical wooden spoon that she uses for most of her fantastical powers.

Mumbo
 Voiced by: Tom Kenny

The Amazing Mumbo is a turquoise-skinned magician whose powers are largely based on stage magic feats; he once found an actually working magical wand whose power drove him insane. He is actually an old man, but his powers make him appear much younger.

Overload
 Voiced by: Dee Bradley Baker; James Arnold Taylor ("Car Trouble")

Overload is a humanoid electric monster with a red-and-black circuit board at its core. It harnesses a series of electrical attacks and the ability to control and manipulate electric-powered machinery, but as the creature is composed largely of electricity, it is extremely vulnerable to water.

Plasmus

 Voiced by: Dee Bradley Baker

Debuting in the series premiere episode "Divide and Conquer", Plasmus is featured multiple times in the series as a secondary villain. As revealed in this episode, Plasmus is a normal human being for as long as he is in a state of sleep; whenever awakened, he becomes a mindless, shape-shifting monster made of slime that has an insatiable appetite for toxic waste and raw sewage.

Professor Chang
 Voices by: James Hong

Professor Chang is a mad scientist who runs an underground smuggling operation providing illegal services for higher-tier villains. He has several workers helping him, but they all wear suits and helmets which hide their faces, and they never speak.

Punk Rocket
 Voiced by: Greg Ellis

Punk Rocket, a musical anarchist, moved from England to the United States to spread what he terms "the sound of chaos." He wears a sleeveless orange prison jumpsuit, and has gray spiked hair and multiple piercings. His weapon is a customized guitar that releases sonic blasts strong enough to knock back a bull elephant by 100 feet, and he is also able to ride it through the air like a surfboard.

Punk Rocket is first seen in "The Lost Episode," rudely interrupting a concert, but is defeated when Beast Boy goads him into cranking the guitar up to maximum, blowing up the sound system it is linked to in the process. Punk Rocket later allies himself with the Brotherhood of Evil and, along with Angel, unsuccessfully attempts to capture Bumblebee in "Calling All Titans". During the first phase of the final battle of "Titans Together," Más knocks him into a portal created by Herald, after which he is not seen again.

Puppet King
 Voiced by: Tracey Walter

The Puppet King is an evil marionette who transfers the Titans' souls into puppets in an attempt to enact a ceremony that would turn the Titans' bodies over to him permanently in "Switched." However, his plans are disrupted when a spell cast by Raven as he was transferring her and Starfire into their puppets resulted in the two female Titans escaping their puppets, although they were left in each other's bodies as a result. After overcoming their issues in controlling the other's powers, Raven and Starfire work together to stop him, and The Puppet King's spells are broken as the Titans' souls are returned to their proper bodies. The Puppet King is also rendered a lifeless marionette as a result, which the Titans stow away in their evidence room.

He is reanimated somehow and appears in the episode "Revved Up", riding his own car with all of the other villains who are going after Robin's most prized possession. He became an honorary member of the Brotherhood of Evil beforehand, later helping Control Freak take down Killowat in "Calling All Titans."

He is beaten by Más early on into the final battle of "Titans Together," but oddly enough, the Puppet King is seen standing with the Teen Titans (between Herald and Jericho) at the point in which Robin tosses Brain to Beast Boy. What happens with him beyond this point is unknown.

Red X
 Voiced by: Scott Menville
Debuting in the episode "Masks", Red X was originally a cover identity devised by Robin to infiltrate Slade's organization, using a high-tech suit capable of creating various X-shaped effects. In the episode "X", a mysterious thief steals the suit for his own use. While his identity is never revealed, he develops a personal rivalry with Robin, although Red X often ends up helping him against a common enemy.

Red X makes his mainstream DC debut in the two-issue teaser comic Future State Teen Titans and its follow-up series Teen Titans Academy where he is presented as a renegade student of Titans' Academy and will be responsible for the future downfall of the team, revealed as a metahuman with electromagnetic powers named Brick Pettirosso.  The legacy of this Red X is also explored with his unknown surrogate father, a mercenary/thief much like the animated version who stole Dick Grayson's Red X suit as revenge for foiling his plans.  It's revealed Red X II killed Brick's foster parents working for Black Mask working on making them soldiers in the False Face Society. After being revealed as Red X, Brick believes Grayson to be his father as told by Red X II, only to be killed by his surrogate, before teleporting away leaving him to die in Grayson's arms.

Saico-Tek
 Voiced by: Keone Young

A supporting villain from Teen Titans: Trouble In Tokyo, Saico-Tek is a high-tech Japanese ninja; he bears a modest resemblance to Tiger Mask, and is most distinguishable by his blue and pink armor. He wields and generates any number of high-tech ninja weapons, including a rocket-propelled jet pack, nunchucks, exploding throwing stars and smoke bombs, many of which take after Saico-Tek's cyan-magenta color scheme.

Spike
 Voiced by: John DiMaggio

A former mechanic and ally of Atlas.

Trident

 Voiced by: Clancy Brown

Trident is an Atlantean criminal armed with the mystical weapon of his namesake, first appearing as the main villain of the episode "Deep Six".

Recurring characters

Arella

 Voiced by: Virginia Madsen

Featured only once in the episode "The Prophecy", Arella is Raven's biological mother. Raven inherits much of her looks from her mother; decked in a white robe, Arella has short-cut violet hair and a Chakra stone on her forehead with the modest exception of a more even, natural flesh tone.

Raven, in desperation to avoid her obligation to release her father upon Earth, travels to her ancestral home of Azarath hoping to find a way to avert the impending apocalypse. She finds, however, that Azarath is largely abandoned, save for a flock of doves which she finds Arella caring for. Arella somberly informs Raven that the prophecy she is to fulfill can't be stopped, and that Earth will fall to Trigon just as Azarath once did; at that moment, the illusion of Azarath falls away and the realm is found to be in ruins—the obvious work of Trigon.

It is never revealed if Arella herself was a product of the illusion, existing as a spirit of the lost civilization, or if she is actually Azarath's lone survivor of Trigon's wrath.

Batman/Bruce Wayne

 Voiced by: None

Batman—the legendary crime-fighter who trained Robin—never appears in the animated series, nor is he ever referred to by name. However, his existence is nonetheless referenced in a number of episodes, proving that Robin in fact did work for Batman, having taken the righteousness oath that drives them both to fight crime and battle evil.

Wintergreen

 Voiced by: None

Though never addressed by his actual name, Wintergreen appears in the series as Slade's butler and right-hand man. He appears as an old man in a white suit and tie, with white gloves and a black dress shirt.

Sticky Joe

He is a very funny and loved character in the show and show's up in many episodes. He wears a hat, jacket and lives in Beast Boy's Room.

See also
 Atlantis in the DC universe
 Azarath
 Doom Patrol
 Gotham City
 H'San Natall
 Justice League
 Tamaran
 Team Titans
 Teen Titans
 Titans East
 Young Justice

References

List of Teen Titans (TV series) characters
Lists of DC Comics animated television characters
Lists of minor fictional characters
Lists of characters in American television animation